Maria Zubková (born 29 April 1984) is a Slovak former footballer who played as a midfielder. She has been a member of the Slovakia women's national team.

References

1984 births
Living people
Women's association football midfielders
Slovak women's footballers
Slovakia women's international footballers
FSK St. Pölten-Spratzern players
Expatriate women's footballers in Austria
Slovak expatriate sportspeople in Austria